FabricLive.64 is a 2012 DJ mix album by English DJ and producer Oneman. The album was released as part of the FabricLive Mix Series.

Track listing

References

External links
Fabric: FabricLive.64

Fabric (club) albums
2012 compilation albums